The 2004 Copa Nissan Sudamericana was the 3rd edition of CONMEBOL's secondary international football tournament. It was won by Argentine club Boca Juniors, who defeated Bolívar of Bolivia to win their first title.

First stage

Argentina Preliminary

|-
!colspan="5"|Argentina 3A Preliminary

|-
!colspan="5"|Argentina 4A Preliminary

|}

Brazil Preliminary

First round

|-
!colspan="5"|Brazil 1A Preliminary

|-
!colspan="5"|Brazil 2A Preliminary

|-
!colspan="5"|Brazil 3A Preliminary

|-
!colspan="5"|Brazil 4A Preliminary

|}

Second round

|-
!colspan="5"|Brazil 5A Preliminary

|-
!colspan="5"|Brazil 6A Preliminary

|-
!colspan="5"|Brazil 7A Preliminary

|-
!colspan="5"|Brazil 8A Preliminary

|}

Ecuador/Cienciano/Venezuela Preliminary

First round

|-
!colspan="5"|Venezuela Preliminary

|}

Second round

|-
!colspan="5"|Venezuela/Cienciano Preliminary

|-
!colspan="5"|Ecuador Preliminary

|}

Chile/Bolivia Preliminary

|-
!colspan="5"|Chile Preliminary

|-
!colspan="5"|Bolivia Preliminary

|}

Colombia/Peru Preliminary

|-
!colspan="5"|Colombia Preliminary

|-
!colspan="5"|Peru Preliminary

|}

Paraguay/Uruguay Preliminary

|-
!colspan="5"|Paraguay Preliminary

|-
!colspan="5"|Uruguay Preliminary

|}

Second stage

Argentina Zone

|-
!colspan="5"|Quarterfinalist 4

|-
!colspan="5"|Quarterfinalist 6

|}

Brazil Zone

|-
!colspan="5"|Quarterfinalist 2

|-
!colspan="5"|Quarterfinalist 7

|}

Ecuador/2003 Champion/Venezuela Zone

|-
!colspan="5"|Quarterfinalist 8

|}

Chile/Bolivia Zone

|-
!colspan="5"|Quarterfinalist 5

|}

Colombia/Peru Zone

|-
!colspan="5"|Quarterfinalist 1

|}

Paraguay/Uruguay Zone

|-
!colspan="5"|Quarterfinalist 3

|}

Bracket

Quarterfinals

|}

Semifinals

|}

Finals

External links
CONMEBOL
Sudamericana 2004

2
Copa Sudamericana seasons